The John Gilmore Riley House is a historic home in Tallahassee, Florida. It is located at 419 East Jefferson Street. On August 1, 1978, it was added to the U.S. National Register of Historic Places. It is now known as the John G. Riley Center/Museum of African American History and Culture.

John G. Riley was a prominent member of the African-American community in Tallahassee. He was born a slave in 1857 and died a millionaire in 1954. Riley was the principal of the Lincoln Academy from 1892 until 1926. This school was later named Lincoln High School. The house, a vernacular wood-framed home, was constructed in 1895 and remained in the family until 1970. 

Constructed in 1890, the Riley House is the last physical evidence of a thriving middle-class African-American community that existed in downtown Tallahassee at the turn of the 20th century. More than a historical landmark, the house is a noble witness to progress and the ability of its owner to succeed despite the odds. Unlike many other historic facilities in Tallahassee, the Riley House has humble beginnings.  There was no dramatic transfer by will; neither did it come with a trust account or other means to help sustain operations or address perpetual needs of maintenance and security.

The original owner, John Gilmore Riley, was born into slavery in 1857. A largely self-taught person, he was chosen on December 1, 1881, to teach at the Lincoln Academy in Tallahassee, and on September 10, 1892, he was selected principal of the school and served until retirement in 1926. Lincoln Academy was one of three freedmen schools in Florida to provide secondary instruction for former slaves and their descendants.

The Riley House was abandoned in 1973. It was restored in 1981 and purchased by the John G. Riley Foundation, Inc. and established as a museum in December 1995. It features an animatronic, speaking figure of Riley, donated by Disney.

References

External links

 Riley House Museum - official site
 Leon County listings at National Register of Historic Places
 Florida's Office of Cultural and Historical Programs
 Podcast Featuring Interview with Althemese Barnes, Founding Director of the Museum

Historic buildings and structures in Leon County, Florida
Houses on the National Register of Historic Places in Florida
National Register of Historic Places in Tallahassee, Florida
History of Tallahassee, Florida
Houses in Tallahassee, Florida
Museums in Tallahassee, Florida
History museums in Florida
African-American museums in Florida
1895 establishments in Florida
Animatronic robots
African-American history of Florida
Houses completed in 1890